The Florida Marlins' 1998 season was the sixth season for the Major League Baseball (MLB) franchise in the National League. It would begin with the team attempting to defend their World Series Champion title, having won the title in 1997. Their manager was Jim Leyland. They played home games at Pro Player Stadium, and finished with a record of 54–108, the worst record in all of baseball. The team is notable for having arguably the biggest fire sale in sports history, auctioning off nearly all of their most notable players. The 1998 Marlins were the first defending World Series champions to finish last in their division and the first to lose 100 games. To make matters worse, the expansion Tampa Bay Devil Rays, who also finished last in their own division (the AL East), were nine games better than the Marlins, at 63-99.

The Marlins won on opening day against the Chicago Cubs, but it would be the only time they were over .500 all season. They promptly lost 11 straight, the most consecutive losses by a reigning champion. By the end of May, they were 17-38, 21 games under .500, and their season was all but over. The Marlins would finish 0–9 against three teams: Cincinnati, San Francisco, and Milwaukee. The 1998 Marlins are the most recent team to finish winless against three separate opponents.

Offseason
November 18, 1997: Devon White was traded by the Florida Marlins to the Arizona Diamondbacks for Jesus Martinez (minors).
December 15, 1997: Scott Podsednik was drafted by the Texas Rangers from the Florida Marlins in the 1997 rule 5 draft.
December 15, 1997: Derrek Lee was traded by the San Diego Padres with Steve Hoff (minors) and Rafael Medina to the Florida Marlins for Kevin Brown.
December 21, 1997: Kevin Millar was signed as a free agent with the Florida Marlins.

Regular season

Opening Day starters

Season standings

Record vs. opponents

Notable transactions
April 15, 1998: Jacob Brumfield was signed as a free agent with the Florida Marlins.

The Mike Piazza trades
 May 14, 1998: Mike Piazza was traded by the Los Angeles Dodgers with Todd Zeile to the Florida Marlins for Manuel Barrios, Bobby Bonilla, Jim Eisenreich, Charles Johnson, and Gary Sheffield.
 May 22, 1998: Mike Piazza was traded by the Florida Marlins to the New York Mets for Preston Wilson, Ed Yarnall, and Geoff Goetz (minors).

Major League debuts 

 Batters:
 Bubba Carpenter (May 13)
 Adam Melhuse (June 16)
 Elvis Pena (September 2)
 Juan Pierre (August 7)
 Pitchers:
 Craig House (August 6)
 David Moraga (June 11)

Citrus Series 
The first interleague game between the Florida Marlins and the Tampa Bay Devil Rays took place at Tropicana Field. The rivalry would be known as the Citrus Series. The Marlins won the game in twelve innings by a score of 3–2 and would go on to win the season series 3 games to 1.

 June 22 - Marlins @ Devil Rays: 3 – 2
 June 23 - Marlins @ Devil Rays: 4 – 6
 June 24 - Marlins vs Devil Rays: 8 – 4
 June 25 - Marlins vs Devil Rays: 5 – 1

Roster

Player stats

Batting

Starters by position
Note: Pos = Position; G = Games played; AB = At bats; R = Runs; H = Hits; HR = Home runs; RBI = Runs batted in; Avg. = Batting average; SB = Stolen bases

Other batters
Note: G = Games played; AB = At bats; R = Runs; H = Hits; HR = Home runs; RBI = Runs batted in; Avg. = Batting average; SB = Stolen bases

Pitching

Starting pitchers 
Note: G = Games pitched; IP = Innings pitched; W = Wins; L = Losses; ERA = Earned run average; SO = Strikeouts

Relief pitchers 
Note: G = Games pitched; IP = Innings pitched; W = Wins; L = Losses; ERA = Earned run average; SO = Strikeouts; SV = Saves

Other pitchers 
Note: G = Games pitched; IP = Innings pitched; W = Wins; L = Losses; ERA = Earned run average; SO = Strikeouts; SV = Saves

Farm system

References

External links
1998 Marlins at Baseball Reference
1998 Florida Marlins at Baseball Almanac

Miami Marlins seasons
Florida Marlins season
Miami Marl